Yevgeny Zhukov (born 20 August 1930) is a Soviet long-distance runner. He competed in the men's 10,000 metres at the 1960 Summer Olympics.

References

External links

1930 births
Possibly living people
Athletes (track and field) at the 1960 Summer Olympics
Soviet male long-distance runners
Olympic athletes of the Soviet Union